Gustavus Adolphus Finkelnburg (April 6, 1837 – May 18, 1908) was a United States representative from Missouri and a United States district judge of the United States District Court for the Eastern District of Missouri.

Education and career

Born on April 6, 1837, near Cologne, Prussia, Finkelnburg immigrated to the United States in 1848 with his parents, who settled in St. Charles, Missouri. He attended St. Charles College, then graduated from the Cincinnati Law School (now the University of Cincinnati College of Law) in 1859. He was admitted to the bar and entered private practice in St. Louis, Missouri starting in 1860. He served in the Union Army during the American Civil War. He was a member of the Missouri House of Representatives from 1864 to 1868, serving as Speaker pro tempore in 1868.

Congressional service

Finkelnburg was elected as a Republican from Missouri's 2nd congressional district to the United States House of Representatives of the 41st United States Congress and as a Liberal Republican to the 42nd United States Congress, serving from March 4, 1869 to March 3, 1873.

Federal judicial service

Finkelnburg received a recess appointment from President Theodore Roosevelt on May 20, 1905, to a seat on the United States District Court for the Eastern District of Missouri vacated by Judge Elmer B. Adams. He was nominated to the same position by President Roosevelt on December 5, 1905. He was confirmed by the United States Senate on December 12, 1905, and received his commission the same day. His service terminated on March 31, 1907, due to his resignation.

Death

Finkelnburg died on May 18, 1908, in Denver, Colorado. He was interred in Bellefontaine Cemetery in St. Louis.

References

Sources

 
 

1837 births
1908 deaths
People from the Rhine Province
German emigrants to the United States
Missouri Liberal Republicans
Republican Party members of the United States House of Representatives from Missouri
Liberal Republican Party members of the United States House of Representatives
Members of the Missouri House of Representatives
Judges of the United States District Court for the Eastern District of Missouri
United States district court judges appointed by Theodore Roosevelt
20th-century American judges
Union Army soldiers
People of Missouri in the American Civil War
People from St. Charles, Missouri
Lawyers from St. Louis
University of Cincinnati College of Law alumni
Burials at Bellefontaine Cemetery
19th-century American politicians
19th-century American judges